Adel Ali Al-Salimi (Arabic: عادل السالمي ) (born 6 July 1979) is a Yemeni football striker for Club Al-Ahli San'a' ، Yemen's top scorer - three times a season: 1997/98, 1999/00, 2001/02 ، Is the second into all-time leading score Yemen national football team and Yemeni League after Ali Al-Nono

International goals

Honours

Club
Al-Ahli San'a'

Yemeni League: 3
 1998–99, 1999–00, 2000–01
Yemeni President Cup: 2
 2001, 2004
Yemeni Unity Cup: 1
 2004
Esteghlal Cup: 1
 2006

References

External links 
 
kooora.com - Arabic

1979 births
Living people
Yemeni footballers
Yemen international footballers
Yemeni expatriate footballers
Yemeni expatriate sportspeople in Oman
Expatriate footballers in Oman
Association football forwards
Footballers at the 2002 Asian Games
Al-Ahli Club Sana'a players
Dhofar Club players
Al-Wehda Club (Sana'a) players
Al-Tilal SC players
Yemeni League players
Oman Professional League players
Asian Games competitors for Yemen